The 1958–59 Hovedserien was the 15th completed season of top division football in Norway.

Overview
It was contested by 16 teams, and Lillestrøm won the championship, their first league title.

Teams and locations
Note: Table lists in alphabetical order.

League tables

Group A

Group B

Results

Group A

Group B

Championship final
Lillestrøm - Fredrikstad: 2-2 (AET), 4-1 (Replay)

References
Norway - List of final tables (RSSSF)

Eliteserien seasons
Norway
1
1